This article lists notable musicians who have played the trumpet, cornet or flugelhorn.

Classical players

 Bill Adam 
 Maurice André 
 Ryan Anthony 
 Jean Baptiste Arban 
 Sir Malcolm Arnold 
 Alison Balsom 
 Marco Blaauw 
 James F. Burke (musician)
 Edward Carroll
 Herbert L. Clarke 
 Billy Cooper 
 Allan Dean 
 Timofei Dokschitzer 
 Ole Edvard Antonsen 
 Niklas Eklund 
 Dennis Ferry 
 Merri Franquin 
 Thomas Gansch 
 Armando Ghitalla 
 Claude Gordon 
 Ludwig Güttler 
 Håkan Hardenberger 
 Thomas Harper
 Tine Thing Helseth
 Adolph "Bud" Herseth 
 David Hickman 
 Matthias Höfs 
 Harry James
 Gil Johnson
 Philip Jones 
 Frank Kaderabek 
 Richard Kelley 
 Uwe Köller 
 Samuel Krauss
 Marcel LaFosse 
 Manny Laureano 
 Greg London 
 David Longoria 
 John MacMurray 
 Georges Mager 
 Albert Mancini 
 Veniamin Margolin 
 Wynton Marsalis 
 Mauro Maur 
 Nathaniel Mayfield
 Malcolm McNab 
 Rafael Méndez 
 Ennio Morricone 
 Maurice Murphy 
 Sergei Nakariakov 
 Geoffrey Payne
 John Rommel 
 Michael Sachs 
 Adolf Scherbaum 
 Charles Schlueter 
 Daniel Schwarz
 Gerard Schwarz 
 Jeffrey Segal 
 Alex Sipiagin
 Philip Smith 
 Marie Speziale 
 Crispian Steele-Perkins
 Thomas Stevens 
 Markus Stockhausen 
 Edward Tarr 
 Guy Touvron 
 William Vacchiano 
 Allen Vizzutti 
 René Voisin 
 Roger Voisin 
 Roger Webster 
 Anton Weidinger 
 James R. West
 Edna White

Jazz and commercial players

 Greg Adams 
 Nat Adderley
 Red Allen
 Herb Alpert
 William "Cat" Anderson
 Louis Armstrong
 Kenny Ball
 Chet Baker
 Guy Barker
 Kenny Baker
 Bix Beiderbecke
 Wayne Bergeron
 Bunny Berigan
 Terence Blanchard
 Buddy Bolden
 Jean-Claude Borelly
 Chris Botti
 Lester Bowie
 Cindy Bradley
 Rick Braun
 Randy Brecker
 Till Brönner
 Clifford Brown
 Ray Brown 
 Miroslav Bukovsky
 Billy Butterfield
 Donald Byrd
 Eddie Calvert
 John Carisi
 Ian Carr
 Benny Carter
 Bill Catalano
 Roy Caton
 Bill Chase
 Doc Cheatham
 Don Cherry 
 Buck Clayton
 Gracie Cole
 Bill Coleman
 Ornette Coleman
 Ken Colyer
 Zach Condon
 Alex Cross
 Ted Curson
 Dick Cuthell
 Wallace Davenport
 Miles Davis
 Kenny Dorham
 Dave Douglas 
 Louis Dowdeswell
 Phil Driscoll
 Johnny Dunn
 Jon Eardley
 Harry Sweets Edison 
 Roy Eldridge
 Don Ellis
 Ziggy Elman
 Howard Evans 
 Jon Faddis
 Dominick Farinacci
 Art Farmer
 Maynard Ferguson
 Chuck Findley
 Michael "Flea" Balzary 
 Tony Fruscella
 Buzz Gardner
 John Dizzy Gillespie
 George Girard
 Volker Goetze
 Josh Dun
 Jerry Gonzalez
 Dusko Goykovich
 Conrad Gozzo
 Bobby Hackett
 Tim Hagans
 Roy Hargrove
 Tom Harrell
 Michael Harris 
 Jon Hassell
 El Hefe
 Dana Heitman
 Johnny Helms
 Arve Henriksen
 Al Hirt
 Arnett Howard
 Freddie Hubbard
 Jeff Hughes 
 Roger Ingram
 Don Jacoby
 Harry James Angus 
 Harry James
 Ingrid Jensen 
 Cui Jian
 Bunk Johnson
 Jonah Jones
 Sean Jones
 Thad Jones
 Freddie Keppard
 George Kid Sheik Cola 
 Harry Kim
 Mannie Klein
 Scott Klopfenstein
 Takuya Kuroda
 Tommy Ladnier
 Yank Lawson
 Booker Little
 Jens Lindemann
 David Longoria
 Lee Loughnane
 Brian Lynch
 Ibrahim Maalouf
 Chuck Mangione
 Wingy Manone
 Wynton Marsalis
 Hugh Masekela
 Jesse McGuire
 Mickey McMahan
 Rafael Méndez
 Bubber Miley
 Punch Miller
 Blue Mitchell
 Ollie Mitchell
 Lee Morgan
 Ennio Morricone
 James Morrison
 Fats Navarro
 Red Nichols
 Joe "King" Oliver
 Yoshimi P-We
 Kye Palmer
 Nicholas Payton
 Mark Pender
 Marvin Peterson 
 Morris Pleasure 
 Herb Pomeroy
 Charlie Porter
 Gerard Presencer
 Louis Prima
 Dizzy Reece
 Cynthia Robinson
 Claudio Roditi
 Ack van Rooyen
 Lior Ron
 Wallace Roney
 Rashawn Ross
 Alan Rubin
 Kermit Ruffins
 Chase Sanborn
 Arturo Sandoval
 Manfred Schoof
 Carl Hilding "Doc" Severinsen
 Charlie Shavers
 Woody Shaw
 Bobby Shew
 Jabbo Smith
 Wadada Leo Smith
 Lew Soloff
 Muggsy Spanier
 Terell Stafford
 Marvin Stamm
 Tomasz Stanko
 Colin Steele
 Rex Stewart
 Byron Stripling
 Tony Terran
 Clark Terry
 Charles Tolliver
 Erik Truffaz
 Kid Thomas Valentine
 Allen Vizzutti
 Cuong Vu
 Derek Watkins
 Tavis Werts
 Kenny Wheeler
 Pharez Whitted
 Cootie Williams
 Johnny Zell

See also

Lists of musicians

References

External links

Trumpeters